Bihud (also Romanized as Bīhūd) is a village in, and the administrative center of Pishkuh Rural District, in the Central District of Qaen County, South Khorasan Province, Iran. At the 2006 census, its population was 1,461, in 497 families.  The village is located 50 kilometers away from the west of Qaen.

Etymology
In Dehkhoda lexicon "bihud" means something that is yellowed or parched because of exposure to heat or fire. In Borhan lexicon, it means something that is near to fire and its color became yellowish. In Rashidi lexicon, it refers to a cloth or something that is in burning point because of fire adjacency. Some lexicographers believe that "bihud" means a charred white wood, which is half-white and half-black. This trait is visible, when the area is observed from a height, in the mountain ranges surrounding the village, which resembles this supposition. If we split it to "bi" and "hud/t" it refers to a place where fish could not survive for long time in its water.

History 
Bihud is a historical village with more than 2500 years of antiquity. There is no authentic document suggesting the exact ancientness of the village, but with respect to the historical places, cemeteries and the recently discovered buried stuffs it can be concluded that its antiquity goes back to pre-Islam period. These evidence shows that the village had been habituated before Islam and its people had been Zoroastrian. There are some historical citadels in the area such as Khoad, Mohalle rezvan, Alishah Bozbishe, Sarcheshmeh Grimonj and Ghaleh Now.

Geographyn 
Its altitude is 1830 meters above the sea level according to. Bihud is surrounded by Gerimenj and Islamabad from north, Hashemiyeh and Tighab from south, Shendan Arab and Nughab from West and Khunik and Tajan from the east.

Weather 
The village has a mountainous cold-temperate climate. Hottest months are August and September, January and February has the lowest sunny days. The yearly average temperature is 14.9 ˚C and sometimes in winter, it is the coldest spot it the country. It has 100 days of frosting through the year. The average precipitation is 175 mm/year. The source of precipitations are the humid Mediterranean and Sudani streams at the end of winter and early in spring. The infiltration of Siberic streams intensely lower the temperature in the winter.
The village is inclosed by a barrier of mountains, so that you can see mountains in all orientations and vista. Agriculture largely depends on amount of annual rain especially winter and spring rain because the cultivation in this area is based on drylanding and successive spring rains are necessary for this type of cultivation. Saffron is the unique agricultural product of this region which, governs the economy of the village. there are small springs around the village which are called Kalate.

See also 

Birjand
Qaen
Saffron

References

External links 
http://wikimapia.org/6780233/fa/%D8%B1%D9%88%D8%B3%D8%AA%D8%A7%D9%8A-%D8%A8%D9%8A%D9%87%D9%88%D8%AF
http://www.indexmundi.com/z/?lat=33.7780556&lon=58.8577778&t=p&r=9760&p=bihud&cc=ir&c=iran
http://www.irimo.ir/farsi/province/khorasan-s.asp
http://www.worldweatheronline.com/v2/weather.aspx?q=Bihud,%20Iran&day=21

Populated places in Qaen County